Bifidobacterium longum is a Gram-positive, catalase-negative, rod-shaped bacterium present in the human gastrointestinal tract and one of the 32 species that belong to the genus Bifidobacterium. It is a microaerotolerant anaerobe and considered to be one of the earliest colonizers of the gastrointestinal tract of infants. When grown on general anaerobic medium, B. longum forms white, glossy colonies with a convex shape.
B. longum is one of the most common bifidobacteria present in the gastrointestinal tracts of both children and adults. B. longum is non-pathogenic, is often added to food products, and its production of lactic acid is believed to prevent growth of pathogenic organisms.

Classification 
In 2002, three previously distinct species of Bifidobacterium, B. infantis, B. longum, and B. suis, were unified into a single species named B. longum with the biotypes infantis, longum, and suis, respectively. This occurred as the three species had extensive DNA similarity including a 16S rRNA gene sequence similarity greater than 97%. In addition, the three original species were phenotypically difficult to distinguish due to different carbohydrate fermentation patterns among strains of the same species.
As probiotic activity varies among strains of B. longum, interest exists in the exact classification of new strains, although this is made difficult by the high gene similarity between the three biotypes. Currently, strain identification is done through polymerase chain reaction (PCR) on the subtly different 16S rRNA gene sequences.

Environment 
B. longum colonizes the human gastrointestinal tract, where it, along with other Bifidobacterium species, represents up to 90% of the bacteria of an infant's gastrointestinal tract. This number gradually drops to 3% in an adult's gastrointestinal tract as other enteric bacteria such as Bacteroides and Eubacterium begin to dominate. Some strains of B. longum were found to have high tolerance for gastric acid and bile, suggesting that these strains would be able to survive the gastrointestinal tract to colonize the lower small and large intestines.
The persistence of B. longum in the gut is attributed to the glycoprotein-binding fimbriae structures and bacterial polysaccharides, the latter of which possess strong electrostatic charges that aid in the adhesion of B. longum to intestinal endothelial cells. This adhesion is also enhanced by the fatty acids in the lipoteichoic acid of the B. longum cell wall.

Metabolism 
B. longum is considered to be a scavenger, possessing multiple catabolic pathways to use a large variety of nutrients to increase its competitiveness among the gut microbiota. Up to 19 types of permease exist to transport various carbohydrates with 13 being ATP-binding cassette transporters. B. longum has several glycosyl hydrolases to metabolise complex oligosaccharides for carbon and energy. This is necessary as mono- and disaccharides have usually been consumed by the time they reach the lower gastrointestinal tract where B. longum resides.  In addition, B. longum can uniquely ferment galactomannan-rich natural gum using glucosaminidases and alpha-mannosidases that participate in the fermentation of glucosamine and mannose, respectively. The high number of genes associated with oligosaccharide metabolism is a result of gene duplication and horizontal gene transfer, indicating that B. longum is under selective pressure to increase its capability to compete for various substrates in the gastrointestinal tract.
Furthermore, B. longum possesses hydrolases, deaminases, and dehydratases to ferment amino acids. B. longum also has bile salt hydrolases to hydrolyze bile salts into amino acids and bile acids. The function of this is not clear, although B. longum could use the amino acids products to better tolerate bile salts.

Pathogenesis 
A number of cases of B. longum infection have been reported in the scientific literature. These are primarily cases in preterm infants that are undergoing probiotic treatment, although there are also reports of infection in adults. Infection in preterm infants manifests as bacteremia or necrotizing enterocolitis, while in adults there have been reports of sepsis and peritonitis.

Research 
B. longum is a constituent in VSL#3. This proprietary, standardized, formulation of live bacteria may be used in combination with conventional therapies to treat ulcerative colitis, and requires a prescription.

Immune system regulation 
The use of B. longum was shown to shorten the duration and minimize the severity of symptoms associated with the common cold with a similar effect to that of neuraminidase inhibitors for influenza.

Bifidobacterium longum 35624 
Bifidobacterium longum ssp. longum 35624, previously classified as Bifidobacterium longum ssp. infantis 35624, classified as Bifidobacterium infantis 35624 before that and still marketed as such. It is sold under the brand name Align in the US and Canada and Alflorex in Ireland, the UK and other European countries. It is patented. This strain was isolated directly from the epithelium of the terminal ileum of a healthy human subject, and is one of the most researched probiotic strains.
Large scale clinical trials have shown that the strain is effective in controlling the symptoms of IBS including bloating, diarrhoea, abdominal pain and discomfort

See also 
 Psychobiotic
 Probiotic
 Gut flora
 Microorganism

References

External links 
 Type strain of Bifidobacterium longum at BacDive –  the Bacterial Diversity Metadatabase
 New Strain of Bifidobacterium May Help Improve Metabolic and Mental Health. On: sci-news. Dec 22, 2020. About APC1472.
 

Bifidobacteriales
Gut flora bacteria
Probiotics
Bacteria described in 1963